Saint Magnus of Anagni, also known as Magnus of Trani or Magnus of Fabrateria Vetus, is venerated as the patron saint of Anagni.

Traditional narrative
According to tradition, he was born in Trani in the 2nd century, the son of a man named Apollonius.  He became a shepherd at an early age to support the family; he had a small flock of sheep and donated his earnings to the poor.  He and his father were baptized by Bishop Redemptus of Trani.
  
When Redemptus died, Magnus was proclaimed bishop of Trani by the people and local clerics.  As bishop Magnus worked to spread Christianity in Fondi, Aquino, and Anagni.  In Anagni, he baptized a young woman named Secundina, who would later die as a Christian martyr.  
Magnus fled to Rome to escape the persecutions of Christians that were led by a man named Tarquinius.  After a while, Magnus headed home, hiding himself along the way.  Soldiers discovered him in a cave near Fondi, however, and he was decapitated near Fabrateria Vetus, in Latium.

Veneration
In the ninth century, his relics were translated from Fondi to Veroli by a man named Plato.  According to tradition, a Muslim overlord named Musa converted Magnus' sepulcher into a stable.  When the horses placed in the stable began to die, Musa became frightened and sold the relics to citizens from Anagni.  These relics were translated to the cathedral of Anagni in the presence of Bishop Zacharias (Zaccaria).  In June 1901, the Right Reverend Monsignor Mezzolinski, secretary to Cardinal Mieczysław Halka Ledóchowski, wrote to the pastor of St. Martin of Tours, Monsignor Francis Zabler: "At last I can fulfill your wish. The venerable Cistercian Nuns of Agnani, Italy, must give up their sanctuary and relinquish their monastery and seek another house.  In their sad plight, Pope Leo XIII has given them permission to donate the relics of certain martyrs under certain conditions. I myself have been at Agnani to investigate the authenticity of these relics. Without a doubt they are genuine." On December 31, 1901, the complete skeletal relics of St. Magnus, a Roman centurion arrived at the Louisville customs office. They were placed in glass reliquaries beneath the north and south transept altars, where they have been venerated ever since. Magnus was afterwards declared patron saint of Anagni, and was also venerated in the town of Colle San Magno, in Frosinone.
Magnus should not be confused with Saint Magnus of Cuneo, martyr of the Theban Legion, who is venerated on the same day.  The Roman Martyrology lists only Saint Magnus of Anagni.  He is mentioned in the Martyrologium Hieronymianum in which his death place is listed as Fabrateria vetus.  Magnus enjoyed wide veneration in the lower Latium region.  His name appears in the Sacramentarium Gelasianum (7th century) and the Sacramentarium of the eighth century.

References

Sources
Spoekler, Rev. Bernard A. "1853-1953: The Centenary of the Church of Saint Martin of Tours, Louisville, Kentucky." St. Martin of Tours Catholic Church, Louisville, 1953.

External links
 San Magno di Anagni (o da Trani)

2nd-century births
2nd-century deaths
People from Trani
2nd-century Christian martyrs
Bishops in Apulia
2nd-century Italian bishops